Darren Dempsey (born 17 October 1975) is an Australian cricketer. He played three first-class matches for South Australia in 2001/02.

See also
 List of South Australian representative cricketers

References

External links
 

1975 births
Living people
Australian cricketers
South Australia cricketers
People from Mount Gambier, South Australia